John Joseph Aloysius Connors (21 August 1927 – 2006) was an English footballer who played as a wing half in the Football League for Darlington and in non-league football for Stockton and Corby Town.

Connors played football for hometown club Stockton, before opening his Darlington career playing at outside left in a 3–1 defeat at home to Lincoln City in the Third Division North in February 1948. He soon resumed his preferred position at left half, but had to compete with Guy Wharton and Norman Parsley for the place. In just over four seasons with the club, he made 65 league appearances, before moving on to Midland League club Corby Town in 1952.

References

1927 births
2006 deaths
Footballers from Stockton-on-Tees
Footballers from County Durham
English footballers
Association football wing halves
Stockton F.C. players
Darlington F.C. players
Corby Town F.C. players
English Football League players
Midland Football League players